The Institute of Statisticians was a British professional organization founded in 1948 to protect the interests of professional statisticians. It was originally named The Association of Incorporated Statisticians Limited, but this was later changed. The institute was formed after the Royal Economic Society prevented a 1947 extension to the royal charter of the Royal Statistical Society which would have allowed it to carry out examinations.

The Institute of Statisticians attempted to obtain a royal charter of its own in 1978 and this led to discussions with the Royal Statistical Society about a possible merger. Talks foundered over disagreement on how to arrange the various membership categories. Within a few years, however, the talks were revisited, and on 1 January 1993, the two organisations merged, becoming simply the Royal Statistical Society.

From 1950 the institute published a journal, first called The Incorporated Statistician (ISSN 14669404) then renamed The Statistician in 1962, before being subsumed into the Journal of the Royal Statistical Society as Series D upon the merger in 1993.

See also
Royal Statistical Society
List of learned societies
List of British professional bodies

References

External links
The Royal Statistical Society's website

Statistical societies
Statisticians
Defunct learned societies of the United Kingdom
1948 establishments in the United Kingdom
1993 disestablishments in the United Kingdom
Organizations established in 1948
Organizations disestablished in 1993